George Frederick Green (22 December 1914 – June 1995) was a professional footballer, who played for Bradford Park Avenue, Huddersfield Town & Reading. He was born in Northowram, in the West Riding of Yorkshire.

References 

 
 Post War English & Scottish Football League A - Z Player's Transfer Database profile

1914 births
1995 deaths
English footballers
People from Northowram
Association football wing halves
English Football League players
Bradford (Park Avenue) A.F.C. players
Huddersfield Town A.F.C. players
Reading F.C. players
Huddersfield Town A.F.C. wartime guest players
Footballers from Yorkshire